Encounter is an Indian crime television series, produced by Endemol India for Sony Entertainment Television. Its central plot was based on 35 encounters in Mumbai over 36 one-hour episodes.

Plot
The series was based on reality based crimes, which was made to trace the encounters that took place in different places of India and those which were in media headlines for months and later everyone forgot.

Cast
 Manoj Bajpayee as Anchor

Episodic appearances

 Aditya Redij as Inspector Bhagat Dave
 Shalmalee Desai as Mrs. Bhagat Dave
 Parag Tyagi as Inspector Ajay Vishwas
 Shivani Manchanda as Ragini Ajay Vishwas
 Rajesh Shringarpure as Shankya
 Shabaaz Abdullah Badi as Ujjwal
 Adaa Khan as Sonali 
 Rohit Khurana as Shaikh Ali
 Pramod Moutho as Commissioner Lawrence Perreira 
 Mishal Raheja as Inspector Nitin Kamte
 Megha Gupta as Dr. Preeti
 Mazher Sayed as Sub Inspector Manish Kadam
 Bikramjeet Kanwarpal as Assistant Police Commissioner Vikramjeet Shinde
 Prashant Narayanan as Shamsher Bhopali
 Avantika Hundal
 Gopal Singh as Sikander Bagdadi
 Eijaz Khan as Inspector Ali Rizvi
 Chetan Hansraj as Mangesh (Mangya) Waghmare
 Sushmita Daan as Razia Ali Rizvi
 Prakash Ramchandani as MLA Janak Shetty
 Kinshuk Mahajan as Inspector Vinod More
 Samiksha Bhatt as Malini Vinod More
 Kunal Bakshi as Sub Inspector Avinash Salunkhe
 Mahesh Shetty as Mahesh Murthy
 Vishal Nayak as Anand Murthy
 Manish Khanna as Babu Rode
 Rohit Roy as Senior Inspector Milind Mandlik 
 Yuvraj Malhotra as Inspector Rizwan Mirza
 Murli Sharma as Katta Shridhar
 Alan Kapoor as Krishna 
 Shresth Kumar as Amay 
 Nandish Sandhu as Inspector Sartaj Qureshi
 Saurabh Dubey as Mr. Qureshi
 Sara Khan as Ayesha Raza
 Ravi Gossain as Kallan
 Vishal Karwal as Inspector Vikas Sawant
 Akshay Dogra as Ramya Narvekar
 Raj Singh as Varun Surve
 Vishal Thakkar as Baburam Sawant
 Prithvi Zutshi as Police Commissioner Vijay Mohanty
 Raman Khatri as Ramesh Solanki
 Piyush Sahdev as Inspector Anil Barve
 Mita Vashisht as Maya Sinha
 Rohit Purohit as Girish Sinha
 Nidhi Jha as Geeta Sinha
 Neetha Shetty as Ritu Joshi
 Arup Pal as Police Commissioner Kapil Mhatre
 Himmanshoo A. Malhotra as Inspector Tilak Nambiyar
 Barkha Bisht Sengupta as Urmila
 Parakh Madan as Sub Inspector Sapna
 Behzaad Khan as Ulhas
 Ruslaan Mumtaz as Inspector Praveen Joshi
 Raj Arjun as Dr. Roshan Lal
 Govind Khatri as Bhau
 Manini Mishra as Inspector Mita Gaekwad
 Mahhi Vij as Aashna
 Vinay Jain as Police Commissioner Surya Paneskar
 Ali Hassan as Bijoy
 Siraj Mustafa Khan as Fazlu
 Ganesh Hedge as Pasha
 Bhanu Uday as Inspector Praveen Waghle
 Manish Wadhwa as Hegde
 Arti Singh as Naina
 Kabbir as Dariyab Pathan
 Sanjay Gagnani as Inspector Farid Khan
 Siddharth Vasudev as Suhas Kariyappa Kunchenaad
 Puneet Vashisht as Vikas Kariyappa Kunchenaad
 Nikhil Arya as Inspector Ajay Karmakar
 Jignesh Mehta as Inspector Sudeep Sharma
 Pankaj Vishnu as Prasadrao Godse
 Rio Kapadia as Police Commissioner 
 Shaleen Malhotra as Inspector Achal Kutty
 Hanif Hilal as Sharib Dabba
 Tushar Jha as Child Achal Kutty

Reception
Throughout the globe, Encounter received mostly mixed to positive critical reception. The show has managed to make a mark with its storyline and presentation along with some brilliant casting.

See also
 Adaalat
 Crime Patrol
 CID

References

2014 Indian television series debuts
Sony Entertainment Television original programming
Indian reality television series
Indian crime television series
2014 Indian television series endings
Fictional portrayals of police departments in India
Television series about organized crime
Works about organised crime in India